Chlamydatus is a genus of plant bugs in the family Miridae. There are more than 30 described species in Chlamydatus.

Species
These 32 species belong to the genus Chlamydatus:

 Chlamydatus acanthioides (J.Sahlberg, 1875)
 Chlamydatus allii V.Putshkov, 1959
 Chlamydatus artemisiae Kelton, 1965
 Chlamydatus associatus (Uhler, 1872) (ragweed plant bug)
 Chlamydatus becki Knight, 1968
 Chlamydatus brevicornis Knight, 1964
 Chlamydatus californicus Schuh & Schwartz, 2005
 Chlamydatus drymophilus Vinokurov, 1982
 Chlamydatus eurotiae Kerzhner, 1962
 Chlamydatus evanescens (Boheman, 1852)
 Chlamydatus keltoni Schuh & Schwartz, 2005
 Chlamydatus laminatus Li & Liu, 2006
 Chlamydatus longirostris Reuter, 1905
 Chlamydatus monilipes Van Duzee, 1921
 Chlamydatus montanus Knight, 1964
 Chlamydatus nigripes Muminov, 1961
 Chlamydatus obliquus (Uhler, 1893)
 Chlamydatus opacus (Zetterstedt, 1838)
 Chlamydatus pachycerus Kiritshenko, 1931
 Chlamydatus pallidicornis Knight, 1964
 Chlamydatus pallidipes (Reuter, 1906)
 Chlamydatus penthesileia Linnavuori, 1989
 Chlamydatus pulicarius (Fallén, 1807)
 Chlamydatus pullus (Reuter, 1871)
 Chlamydatus ruficornis Knight, 1959
 Chlamydatus saltitans (Fabricius, 1803)
 Chlamydatus sarafrazii Linnavuori, 1998
 Chlamydatus schuhi Knight, 1964
 Chlamydatus sichuanensis Li & Liu, 2006
 Chlamydatus suavis (Reuter, 1876)
 Chlamydatus uniformis (Uhler, 1893)
 Chlamydatus wilkinsoni (Douglas & Scott, 1866)

References

Further reading

External links

 

Nasocorini
Articles created by Qbugbot